Charles Edgar Walker Hayes (born December 27, 1979) is an American country pop singer and songwriter. He has released three studio albums: Reason to Rhyme in 2011 on Capitol Records Nashville, and Boom and Country Stuff the Album in 2017 and 2022 on Monument Records. Hayes has charted multiple singles on the Billboard Hot Country Songs and Country Airplay charts; his highest-peaking is "Fancy Like", which reached the number one position on both charts between late 2021 and early 2022.

Early life
Hayes was born on December 27, 1979, in Mobile, Alabama. His father, Charles Hayes, was a realtor and died in 2021. Hayes graduated from Birmingham–Southern College in 2002 with a bachelor's degree in music and an emphasis on piano.

Musical career
Hayes and his wife moved to Nashville in 2005, hoping to get in the country music business. He landed a job writing songs for a Nashville publishing company and then signed a contract with Mercury Records Nashville, though he was quickly dropped and moved to Capitol Records Nashville. In 2010, he released his first single, "Pants". It debuted at No. 60 on the Hot Country Songs charts dated for the week ending September 18, 2010. Kyle Ward of Roughstock rated the single 3.5 stars out of 5. Hayes debuted the video for the song in December 2010. Hayes also appeared on an episode of 19 Kids and Counting, singing a song he wrote about Jill and her now husband, Derick's, proposal. "Pants" and a second single, "Why Wait for Summer", both appeared on an album for Capitol Records titled Reason to Rhyme.

Hayes co-wrote and sang guest vocals on "Dirty Side", a cut from Colt Ford's 2014 album Thanks for Listening. He also co-wrote Rodney Atkins' late-2014 single "Eat Sleep Love You Repeat". After losing his contract with Capitol Records, Hayes worked at a Costco to support himself.

In 2016, Hayes signed a publishing and production deal with Shane McAnally and SMACK/RareSpark, through which he released two extended plays: 8Tracks Vol. 1 and 8Tracks Vol. 2. This was followed by his first single for Monument Records, "You Broke Up with Me". It appears on his first Monument album, Boom. It would be his breakthrough hit on the Billboard charts.

In August 2018, Hayes released a single titled "90's Country", whose song lyrics contain multiple references to titles of country songs from the 1990s.

On June 4, 2021, Hayes released the EP Country Stuff. One of its tracks, "Fancy Like", became a viral hit through TikTok and reached number 3 on the US Billboard Hot 100 and number 1 on the Hot Country Songs chart, becoming Hayes' highest-charting effort to date. It was subsequently released to country radio as his next single, and debuted at number 53 on the Billboard Country Airplay chart. "Fancy Like" appeared on an extended play titled Country Stuff, the tracks of which also carried over to his third studio album, 2022's Country Stuff the Album. The album has also produced the singles "U Gurl" and "AA".

Personal life
He lives in Thompson's Station, Tennessee, with his wife, Laney Beville Hayes, and their six children. The couple married in 2004. Their seventh child and fourth daughter, Oakleigh Klover Hayes, died shortly after birth on June 6, 2018. Laney had to undergo surgery due to profuse bleeding after the birth. Hayes is a Christian and has been sober since 2015.

Discography

Albums

Extended plays

Singles

Music videos

Awards and nominations

Notes

References

External links
Official website

American country singer-songwriters
Capitol Records artists
Living people
Musicians from Mobile, Alabama
1979 births
Monument Records artists
Country musicians from Alabama
21st-century American singers
Singer-songwriters from Alabama
Birmingham–Southern College alumni
University of North Carolina at Chapel Hill alumni